Peter Fitz (8 August 1931 – 10 January 2013) was a German stage and film actor.

Biography

Fitz completed an apprenticeship at the drama school of the Deutsches Schauspielhaus in Hamburg in the 1950s. In the 1960s, engagements at the Schauspiel Frankfurt theatre followed. Director Peter Stein brought him into the ensemble of the Berlin Schaubühne theatre, where he worked under the direction of Stein as well as Klaus Michael Grüber.

During the course of his career, Fitz performed at all major German-language venues, such as the Vienna Burgtheater, the Munich Kammerspiele, Berlin's Schiller Theater, as well as the Salzburg Festival. In 1980 and 1983, he was voted Actor of the Year by the editors of Theater heute magazine.

Fitz' theater work took precedence throughout his career, but he also appeared in a number of films and television productions. Some of these include the 1987 film Au revoir les enfants and The Wannsee Conference in 1984. In 1996, Fitz was nominated for the German Film Award for his portrayal of Reinhold Schünzel in Hans-Christoph Blumenberg's .
He was also known to a broad television audience through crime films and series, as well as for his voice acting work.

Peter Fitz died in his Berlin apartment on 10 January 2013, at the age of 81. He is the father of actress Hendrikje Fitz (1961–2016) and actor Florian Fitz (born 1967). He is buried in the Waldfriedhof Zehlendorf Berlin forest cemetery. His daughter was buried next to him upon her death in 2016.

Selected filmography

Film

Television

Awards and recognition
 1980, 1983: Actor of the Year, Theater heute magazine
 1996: Nominated for German Film Award for One More Kiss and He's Dead
 2001: Nestroy Theatre Prize for best supporting role in Rosmersholm
 2005: Hessian TV Award as an ensemble member of the film Die Konferenz

References

External links
 

1931 births
2013 deaths
German male film actors
Burials at the Waldfriedhof Zehlendorf
German male television actors
People from Kaiserslautern